El Pajonal is a village and municipality within the Pomán Department of Catamarca Province in northwestern Argentina.

References

Populated places in Catamarca Province